Riga Central Market is Europe's largest market and bazaar in Riga, Latvia. It is one of the most notable structures from 20th century in Latvia and has been included in UNESCO World Heritage Site list together with Old Riga in 1998. It was planned from 1922 and built from 1924 to 1930. The main structures of the market are five pavilions constructed by reusing old German Zeppelin hangars and incorporating Neoclassicism and Art Deco styles.

The joint stock company Rīgas Centrāltirgus is currently owned by the Riga municipality and the Chairman of the Board since 2010 is Anatolijs Abramovs.

Overview
Currently, due to the rise of supermarkets, the market is showing similar trends and is seen as a cheap shopping place in Riga, however Riga City Council has expressed priority of preserving the market's mission and cultural value. The main goal of the company's Board of Directors is increase of customer flow throughout the market. They noted that among the problems is petty theft, customer deceit, and homeless people. Administration has determined to take tough measures on sellers that are deceiving customers. In 2009 market renovation plans were proposed and plans conceived in 2010. There are also future plans to join nearby train and bus station into a single complex as well as increase selling of national produce.

History

Construction

Produce has been sold on the banks of Daugava since 1571 and in 1863 trade stand rows were built. On December 18, 1922, Riga City Council decided to move the crowded and highly unsanitary Daugavmala Market to a new enclosed location in conformity with hygienic and economic requirements. The market's plan was selected in an international competition. One of the highest prizes was received by Riga's architect Pāvils Dreijmanis and engineer S. Žitkovs collaborative proposal to reuse metal frameworks from World War I German Zeppelin hangars Walhalla and Walther used in Vaiņode Air Base. The initial large structure design was impractical due to their size and weather conditions and the new buildings only used the top parts of the hangar design. The buildings themselves were constructed from stone and reinforced concrete.

The construction started in June 1924 and finished in autumn 1930, taking seven years instead of planned five as construction halted during 1926–1928 due to financial problems. The development was overseen by the city council's marketing department head Klāvs Lorencs. The overseeing architects were Pāvils Dreijmanis and P. Pavlovs together with engineers V. Isajevs and G. Tolstojs. The construction was carried out by stock company "Construction" and market's construction office under the supervision of V. Isajevs. Riga paid nearly 5 million roubles to the state property commission. This was at the time the biggest project in Europe spanning . Five pavilions were envisioned with the largest  hangar for wholesale and meat processing and smaller ones for retail. Four of them are located side by side and the biggest, fifth, was built perpendicular to them. All buildings had modern central heating and electric lighting. The complex was built in Art Deco style. A wide basement was built under the hangars for storage. In 1961, during Soviet time, almost  of goods could be stored. The products were moved topside with cranes without disturbing traffic and sellers. The basement has three tunnels connecting to the adjacent river bank. Retail sales began November 10, 1930, the same day Daugavmala Market closed. Even before the opening, hangars were used for various expositions and shows during the first half of the year.

Although the Central Market was three times the size of the Daugavmala Market, the majority of space was occupied by offices, warehouses and basements. The rent per square meters exceeded that of other markets and locations. Retail sellers could not afford the rent and wholesale merchants could not place their workers. This gave rise to high prices. This was solved by making an open-air  roofed porch, with a 170 horse team capacity. In 1938 a separate horse stable opened. In 1936 the most modern bird slaughterhouse in the state opened.

Juris Dambis, head of the State Inspection for Heritage Protection, says "When Riga Central Market was first opened on November 2, 1930, it was the largest and the most progressive marketplace on earth." During the 1930s the market pavilions were one of the main tourist attractions. A wide and cheap array of produce was available for degustation. Tourists from Germany and England highly appreciated the butter and bacon. The fish pavilion was especially attractive with large, colourful aquariums. The large number of tourists furthered the Central Markets reputation as one of the more grandiose buildings in Europe.

During occupations 

The market was not affected by the first Soviet occupation in 1940. However, the Nazi German occupation lasted for three and a half years. Farmers were not allowed to freely sell their produce and were forced to supply the German Army and the market sold only limited amounts. Beginning September 1, 1941, food cards were required for purchase. During these years first roof repairs were carried out on May 30, 1942. The market's territory was readjusted to be suitable for war times. The two pavilions closest to the Daugava were converted into housing the German 726th supply unit's vehicle engine repair shop. A fire hazardous lumber storage was set nearby to necessitate Opel. Three repair shop office barracks were planned, but only one was active prior to the 1944 Soviet Union occupation.

During the Soviet occupation, the market was renamed Central Kolkhoz Market in 1949. The Soviet press praised the market as one of the best markets in the Soviet Union. In 1950 nine out of ten farms were unified in kolkhozes during the agriculture collectivisation and by 1961 the majority of goods were supplied collectively by 60 kolkhozes.

In the 1980s the market's ammonia based refrigerating plants were replaced with freon machinery. The low-pressure steam heating system was swapped with a connection to the city's central heating system. In 1983 the fruit and vegetable pavilion caught fire, which spread to peat insulation and lasted for tens of hours. In 1987 rat problems were solved in the market.

Heritage 

On October 18, 1983, the Latvian Soviet Socialist Republic's Council of Ministers announced the market as a cultural heritage site. Shortly after Latvia regained independence 1991, market director Leonīds Lapoško showed that the market was in dire condition, especially underground. On January 3, 1995, the city council established stock company Riga Central Market. In the next half year it merged with Riga Market Company to form a combined location between the central market's pavilions and outside street bazaar. In August 1998 Riga City Council rented the outside market territory until 2045.

In 1998 the market territory, together with Old Riga, were included in the UNESCO World Heritage Site list. The market's pavilions are five of nine Zeppelin hangars remaining in the world.

On January 15, 2019, the reconstructed Gastronomy Pavilion, which had been closed since the fall of 2016, was opened. The renovation of the gastronomy pavilion cost about 1.7 million euros.

Architecture

The architecture was influenced by practical need as well as Neoclassicism. The Zeppelin hangars gave the pavilions their look and only certain parts could be accented with Art Deco style.

References

External links

 Riga Central Market 
 Pictures from Riga Central Market
 View of the Riga Central Market (WebCam), balticlivecam.com

Central Market
Economy of Riga
Retail markets in Riga
History of Riga
Art Deco architecture
Commercial buildings completed in 1930
1930 establishments in Latvia